Belmont High School is a small public high school of 487 students in Belmont, New Hampshire, United States. Along with the town of Canterbury, Belmont is part of the Shaker Regional School District.

They use a Native American for their team mascot, named the "Red Raider," using the colors red and white.

References

Schools in Belknap County, New Hampshire
Public high schools in New Hampshire
Belmont, New Hampshire